The Way I Remember It may refer to:

The Way I Remember It, 1991 autobiography of the mathematician Walter Rudin
The Way I Remember It, 2010 album by country music singer Teea Goans
"The Way I Remember It", a song from the Trent Willmon album Broken In

See also
"That's the Way I Remember It", a song from the Garth Brooks album Greatest Hits
The Way It Was (disambiguation)